Blog fiction is a form of blogging that can be defined as any forms of narrative written and published through online web journals. Fictional blogs are a changing phenomenon with great potential to young writers. Blog fiction can also be done by creating an online blog website.

History
During the 20th century, there were various authors who were leading the change to bring about the end of the print book. They intended to replace it with a mode of expression that was nonlinear and free to cross as many boundaries as the ever-increasing powers of the computers were making possible. Eventually, blog fiction was developed in 1965; however, it was referred to as a hypertext or web. Well-known philosopher and sociologist Ted Nelson coined the term 'hypertext'. He defined hypertext as "a body of pictorial material interconnected in such a complex way that it could not conveniently be presented or represented on paper." Although Ted Nelson was given credit for combining the term and defining hypertext, many people were confused on what tasks it could complete. Most people assumed that it involved linking, like the World Wide Web. After much confusion and speculation about hypertext, the first Hypertext Conference was held in 1985.

Fake or real blogs
Fictional blogging is all about expressing ideas and creativity. Blog fiction or fictional blogging help readers find who they are. 

Fake blogs, also known as flogs, are misleading web sites that launch scareware and post ads and comments to a real blog site to lure readers to the page. The con artists who run these sites currently make an estimated $750 million a year by selling products from miracle cures to phony anti-virus software and items of questionable value. Most of them have one article posing as an impartial news report commenting on a miracle product.

Controversy
Though many critics and literary scholars dismiss blog fiction as an inferior and faddish literary form, there is a trend towards the recognition of blogs as a legitimate arena of fiction production. For instance, self-publishing provider Lulu sponsors the Lulu Blooker Prize, which began in 2006. The Blooker prize is an award given to the best "blook" of the year: a work of fiction begun as blog fiction and then transformed into a printed publication. Thus, even despite the radical and democratizing potential of blog fiction, printed works still maintain greater authority and "official" status in the world of fiction and academia.

References

Further reading
 
 
 

Blogs
Fiction
Fiction forms
Web fiction
1965 introductions